Bernard Fein (November 13, 1926 – September 10, 1980) was an American actor, television producer, screenwriter and film director. He is best known for co-creating and associate producing the 1960s television sitcom Hogan's Heroes; a show which he also occasionally wrote for, including the pilot episode. He directed only one film, the 1974 movie View from the Loft.

As an actor Fein's first big break came in 1955 when he landed the recurring role of Pvt. Gomez on Sergeant Bilko which he portrayed through 1959. He appeared regularly as a guest actor on numerous programs from 1959 through 1967 on such shows as The Untouchables, Sea Hunt, Lawman, Alfred Hitchcock Presents, 77 Sunset Strip, Perry Mason, and The F.B.I.. He also appeared in a handful of films during this time including The Facts of Life and Robin and the 7 Hoods, among others.

Fein is portrayed by Kyle S. More in the 2022 Paramount+ miniseries, The Offer, and by Greg Grunberg later that year in the motion picture, The Fabelmans.

Filmography

Notable TV guest appearances
 Naked City playing "Dasher" in episode: "Even Crows Sing Good" (episode # 1.16) January 13, 1959
 Johnny Staccato playing "Ramsey" (as Bernie Fein) in episode: "The Unwise Men" (episode # 1.15) December 24, 1959
 Johnny Midnight playing "Ravioli" in episode "Romeo and Julie" 1960.
 The Twilight Zone playing "Penell" in episode: "The Four of Us Are Dying" (episode # 1.13) January 1, 1960
 Mr. Lucky playing "Spanish Charley" in episode: "Aces Back to Back" (episode # 1.11) January 2, 1960
 The Untouchables playing "Tim Harrington" (uncredited) in episode: "The St. Louis Story" (episode # 1.16) January 28, 1960
 Sea Hunt playing "Boss" in episode: "Expatriate's Return" (episode # 3.10) March 12, 1960
 M Squad in episode: "Let There Be Light" (episode # 3.29) April 5, 1960
 The Alaskans playing "Tom" in episode: "Heart of Gold" (episode # 1.30) May 1, 1960
 The Man From Blackhawk playing "Renard" in episode: "Remember Me Not" (episode # 1.26) September 9, 1960
 Lawman in episode: "The Post" (episode # 3.8) November 6, 1960
 Coronado 9 playing "Frank Fishman" (as Bernie Fine) in episode: "Careless Joe" (episode # 1.13) November 29, 1960
 Tallahassee 7000 playing "Vincent Aiello" in episode: "Meeting of the Mob"
 Michael Shayne playing "Sid, Fat Thug" in episode: "The Badge" (episode # 1.17) January 27, 1961
 The Untouchables playing "Richie" in episode: "Augie "The Banker" Ciamino" (episode # 2.17) February 9, 1961
 Thriller in episode: "The Merriweather File" (episode # 1.21) February 14, 1961
 The Law and Mr. Jones in episode: "One By One" (episode # 1.28) May 5, 1961
 Thriller playing "Stage Manager" in episode: "The Terror in Teakwood" (episode # 1.33) May 16, 1961
 The Lawless Years playing "Bo" in episode: "The Sonny Rosen Story II" (episode # 3.2) May 19, 1961
 Cain's Hundred (as Bernie Fein) in episode: "Degrees of Guilt" (episode # 1.5) October 17, 1961
 Alfred Hitchcock Presents playing "Marty" in episode: "Cop for a Day" (episode # 7.4) October 31, 1961
 77 Sunset Strip playing "Sam Treynor" (as Bernie Fein) in episode: "The Missing Daddy Caper" (episode # 4.9) November 17, 1961
 The Untouchables playing "Marty Wilger" (as Bernie Fein) in episode: "Jigsaw" (episode # 3.7) November 23, 1961
 Thriller playing "Lester Clyne" in episode: "A Wig for Miss Devore" (episode # 2.19) January 29, 1962
 The Untouchables playing "Ed Harker" in episode: "The Maggie Storm Story" (episode # 3.20) March 29, 1962
 The Detectives Starring Robert Taylor playing "Simon Metapuff" in episode: "Three Blind Mice: Part 1" (episode # 3.24) March 30, 1962
 The Detectives Starring Robert Taylor playing "Simon Metapuff" in episode: "Three Blind Mice: Part 2" (episode # 3.25) April 6, 1962
 The Tall Man (as Bernie Fein) in episode: "The Runaway Groom" (episode # 2.34) April 28, 1962
 The Defenders playing "Max" in episode: "Madman: Part 1" (episode # 2.6) October 20, 1962
 The Defenders playing "Max" in episode: "Madman: Part 2" (episode # 2.7) October 27, 1962
 Hawaiian Eye playing "Bane Craig" in episode: "Lament for a Saturday Warrior" (episode # 4.5) October 30, 1962
 Sam Benedict playing "Harry" in episode: "Hear the Mellow Wedding Bells" (episode # 1.8) November 3, 1962
 Sam Benedict playing "Harry Owen" in episode: "Too Many Strangers" (episode # 1.13) December 8, 1962
 The Untouchables playing "Louie Akers" in episode: "Doublecross" (episode # 4.12) December 18, 1962
 Perry Mason playing "Foreman" in episode: "The Case of the Shoplifter's Shoe" (episode # 6.13) January 3, 1963
 The Twilight Zone playing "Heckler" in episode: "He's Alive" (episode # 4.4) January 24, 1963
 The Third Man in episode: "An Act of Atonement" (episode # 4.12) July 13, 1963
 Bob Hope Presents the Chrysler Theatre in episode: "The Candidate" (episode # 1.9) December 6, 1963
 The F.B.I. playing "Andy Morton" in episode: "The Hijackers" (episode # 1.15) December 26, 1965
 The Man from U.N.C.L.E. playing "Frank Cariago" in episode: "The Super Colossal Affair" (episode # 3.4) October 7, 1966
 Felony Squad playing "Tom Baughmiller" in episode: "My Mommy Got Lost" (episode # 2.11) November 15, 1967

Writer
 Hogan's Heroes (1965) (TV) (creator)
 The Forgotten Man (1971) (TV)

Director
 View from the Loft (1974)

Producer
 Hogan's Heroes (1965) (TV) (associate producer)

External links
 

1926 births
1980 deaths
American male film actors
American film directors
American male screenwriters
American male stage actors
American male television actors
20th-century American male actors
Screenwriters from New York (state)
20th-century American male writers
20th-century American screenwriters